The Dirt Band is the tenth album from the Nitty Gritty Dirt Band.

Track listing
"In For The Night" (Ed Sanford, John Townsend)
"Wild Nights" (Jeff Hanna, Jimmie Fadden)
"For a Little While" (Bob Carpenter, David James Holster)
"Lights" (Rick Roberts)
"Escaping Reality" (Casey Kelly)
"Whoa Babe" (Jimmie Faddden)
"White Russia" (John McEuen, William E. McEuen)
"You Can't Stop Loving Me Now" (Jeff Pollard)
"On The Loose" (Jeff Hanna)
"Angel" (Jeff Hanna, Jimmie Fadden)

Personnel
Jeff Hanna – vocal, electric guitar, percussion, guitars
Jimmy Fadden – harp, vocals, syndrums, national guitar, percussion
John McEuen – lap steel, banjo, acoustic guitar, steel guitar, mandolin, fiddle, dobro
Bob Carpenter – piano, organ, background vocals, accordion
Al Garth – Sax, fiddle, horns, guitars, percussion, clarinet, recorders, electric piano
Merle Bregante – drums, percussion
Richard Hathaway – bass, guitars, percussion

Additional musicians
Mickey Thomas – scat vocals
Leon Medica – bass, guitars
Micheal MacDonald – Background Vocal
Rosemary Butler – Background Vocal
Jan Garrett – Background Vocal
Al Kooper – Arp Strings
Bobby Mason – electric rhythm guitar
Bryan Savage – horns
Denny Christensen – horns
Whoa Jane Cicero – percussion
A. Haden Gregg – background vocals
Greg "Fingers" Taylor – harp

Production
Producer – Jeff Hanna
Engineer – Jerry Cell

References
Track listing, Personnel, and Production from album liner notes unless otherwise noted.

Nitty Gritty Dirt Band albums
1978 albums
United Artists Records albums